Martha Masters may refer to:

Martha Masters (musician) (born 1972), American classical guitarist
Martha Masters (House), a fictional character on the American TV series House